Besri (also Romanized as Beşrī, Başarī, and Basri; also known as Baştī) is a village in Pol-e Doab Rural District, Zalian District, Shazand County, Markazi Province, Iran. At the 2006 census, its population was 1,034, in 311 families.

References 

Populated places in Shazand County